James Richard Avery (born July 11, 1944) is a former American football tight end in the National Football League for the Washington Redskins.  He played college football at North Central College.

1944 births
Living people
Washington Redskins players
American football tight ends
Players of American football from Grand Rapids, Michigan